Gary Coltman (born 1965), is a male retired cyclist who competed for England.

Cycling career
He represented England and competed in the 4,000 metres individual pursuit and won a bronze medal in the 4,000 metres team pursuit event, with Chris Boardman, Rob Muzio, Guy Rowland and Jon Walshaw, at the 1986 Commonwealth Games in Edinburgh, Scotland.

Coltman was a 5 times British track champion, winning the British National Omnium Championships from 1989 to 1993 and was a professional from 1988 to 1996.

Management
In 2013 he became the head of performance for Scottish Cycling.

References

1965 births
English male cyclists
Commonwealth Games medallists in cycling
Commonwealth Games bronze medallists for England
Cyclists at the 1986 Commonwealth Games
Living people
Medallists at the 1986 Commonwealth Games